The Roman Catholic Diocese of Sault Sainte Marie(-Marquette / in Michigan) is a titular see of the Roman Catholic Church in northern Michigan.  Until 1937, it was an episcopal see, the Diocese of Sault Saint Marie-Marquette. 

As with other titular sees, the Diocese of Sault Sainte Marie no longer functions and is considered by the Vatican as a dead diocese.  The current titular bishop is Auxiliary Bishop Francis J. Kane of the Archdiocese of Chicago.

History 
On July 29, 1853, the Vatican established the Apostolic Vicariate of Upper Michigan.  Comprising territory from the Diocese of Detroit in northern Michigan, the vicariate was headquartered in Sault Ste. Marie. Holy Name of Mary Church in Sault Ste. Marie was the cathedral church.

The Vatican elevated the apostolic vicariate on January 9, 1857, to the Diocese of Sault Sainte Marie. On October 23, 1865, the vicariate was renamed the Diocese of Sault Sainte Marie-Marquette and the Vatican named the Venerable Frederic Baraga as its first bishop. The Vatican formally suppressed the diocese on January 3, 1937, reassigning its territory and Bishop Baraga to the new Diocese of Marquette.  The new see city was Marquette, Michigan.

Residential bishops

Apostolic Vicar of Upper Michigan 
 Venerable Frederic Baraga (term July 29, 1853 – January 9, 1857)

Bishop of Sault Sainte Marie 
 Venerable Frederic Baraga (term January 9, 1857 – October 23, 1865)

Bishops of Sault Sainte Marie-Marquette 
 Venerable Frederic Baraga (term October 23, 1865– January 19, 1868)
 Ignatius Mrak (term September 25, 1868 – April 28, 1879)
 John Vertin (tern May 16, 1879 – February 26, 1899)
 Frederick Eis (term June 7, 1899 – July 8, 1922)
 Paul Joseph Nussbaum, CP (term November 14, 1922 – June 24, 1935)
 Joseph Casimir Plagens (term November 16, 1935 – January 3, 1937)

Titular see 
The Vatican restored the Diocese of Sault Saint Marie-Marquette in 1995 as a titular bishopric under the name "Titular See of Sault Sainte Marie".  In 1996, it was renamed the "Titular See of Sault Sainte Marie in Michigan". Its titular bishops include:

 Archbishop Allen Henry Vigneron (term June 12, 1996 – January 10, 2003)
 Bishop Francis J. Kane (term January 24, 2003 – present)

See also 
 Alphabetical list of Catholic titular sees

Notes

Source and External links 
 GCatholic with incumbent bio links

Roman Catholic Ecclesiastical Province of Detroit
Marianopolis in Michigania
History of Michigan